Iqbal Mehmood (born 21 November 1949) is an Indian politician and a member of the Uttar Pradesh Legislative Assembly from Sambhal. He is the senior leader of Samajwadi Party.

Early life and education
Iqbal Mehmood was born in Sambhal, Uttar Pradesh. He holds Bachelor of Science degree from Aligarh Muslim University in 1974.

Political career
Iqbal Mehmood has been an MLA seven times, first from 1991 to 1992, and then for six consecutive terms starting in 1996 for which he is now the incumbent. He represented the Sambhal constituency and is a member of the Samajwadi Party.

References

Samajwadi Party politicians
Living people
1949 births
People from Sambhal district
Uttar Pradesh MLAs 2012–2017
Uttar Pradesh MLAs 2017–2022
Uttar Pradesh MLAs 2022–2027
Samajwadi Party politicians from Uttar Pradesh